Rauno Väinämö Lehtinen (7 April 1932 in Tampere – 1 May 2006 in Helsinki) was a Finnish conductor and composer. He composed the 1960s hit Letkis which was based on a folk-dance. Letkis was recorded in over 92 countries.

Lehtinen was also the man behind Tom-tom-tom, which was the most successful Finnish participant (6th) in the Eurovision song contest until 2006. The song was performed by Marion Rung in 1973.

External links
Eurovision square

1932 births
2006 deaths
musicians from Tampere
Finnish composers
Finnish male composers
Finnish music arrangers
20th-century conductors (music)
20th-century male musicians